Odilon Goyette (November 3, 1842 – September 5, 1921) was a farmer and political figure in Quebec. He represented La Prairie in the Legislative Assembly of Quebec from 1887 to 1890 as a member of the Parti national.

He was born in Saint-Constant, Canada East, the son of Joseph Goyette and Henriette Delorier. Goyette served on the municipal council for Saint-Constant, also serving as mayor. He was elected to the Quebec assembly in an 1887 by-election held following the death of Léon-Benoît-Alfred Charlebois. His election was overturned by the Quebec Superior Court in 1889 but he won the subsequent by-election held later that year. Goyette died in Saint-Constant at the age of 78.

References 

Quebec Liberal Party MNAs
Mayors of places in Quebec
1842 births
1921 deaths
People from Saint-Constant, Quebec